Jurie George van Vuuren (born 7 June 1993 in Ladybrand) is a South African rugby union player who plays for the Utah Warriors in Major League Rugby (MLR).

He previously played for the in the Currie Cup and in the Rugby Challenge

He also was a member of the Southern Kings. His regular position is lock or flanker.

Career

With no prior senior experience, Van Vuuren joined the ' touring squad during the 2014 Super Rugby season following several injuries to first team players.

References

South African rugby union players
Living people
1993 births
People from Ladybrand
Stormers players
Western Province (rugby union) players
Rugby union locks
Southern Kings players
Eastern Province Elephants players
Utah Warriors players
Rugby union flankers
Rugby union number eights
Rugby union players from the Free State (province)
Tel Aviv Heat players
South African expatriate sportspeople in Israel
South African expatriate rugby union players
Expatriate rugby union players in Israel